Tokeneke is a census-designated place (CDP) in the town of Darien, Fairfield County, Connecticut, United States. It comprises the southeast part of the town, occupying several peninsulas and islands that extend into Long Island Sound, between the Goodwives River to the west and the Fivemile River to the east. It is bordered to the north by Darien Downtown and to the east by the city of Norwalk.

Tokeneke was first listed as a CDP prior to the 2020 census. As of the 2020 Census, Tokeneke has a population of 2,794.

References 

Census-designated places in Fairfield County, Connecticut
Census-designated places in Connecticut